The Astounding 12-String Guitar of Glen Campbell is the third album by American singer-guitarist Glen Campbell, recorded in stereo and released in 1964 by Capitol Records.  The album is entirely instrumental, with the exception of one cut: "Walkin' Down the Line", on which Campbell also sings.

Track listing
Side 1
 "Lonesome Twelve" (Roy Clark) – 2:30
 "Puff the Magic Dragon" (Peter Yarrow, Leonard Lipton) – 2:25
 "The Ballad of Jed Clampett" (Paul Henning) – 1:53
 "Blowin' in the Wind" (Bob Dylan) – 2:26
 "500 Miles (Away From Home)" (Hedy West) – 2:20
 "Walkin' Down the Line" (Bob Dylan) – 2:05

Side 2
 "12-String Special" (Glen Campbell) – 1:53
 "Green Green" (Barry McGuire, Randy Sparks) – 2:01
 "Wimoweh" (arranged and adapted by Paul Campbell) – 2:30
 "Bull Durham" (Glen Campbell) – 2:08
 "La-Bamba" (adapted by Glen Campbell) – 2:12
 "This Land Is Your Land" (Woody Guthrie) – 2:15

Personnel
Music
 Glen Campbell – vocals, twelve-string guitar
 Chip Douglas – bass guitar
 Carl Tandburg – bass guitar
 Hal Blaine – drums
 Donny Cotton – drums
 Earl Palmer – drums
 Roy Clark – banjo

Production
 Kermit Walter – producer
 Nick Venet – producer
 George Jerman/Capitol Photo Studio – photography

References

Glen Campbell albums
1964 albums
Capitol Records albums
Albums produced by Nick Venet
Albums recorded at Capitol Studios